Andrew Ling (凌顯祐) is a Hong Kong violist. , he is the principal violist of the Hong Kong Philharmonic. He has performed solo performances with the Hong Kong Philharmonic to critical acclaim. In the past, he had assumed the role of concertmaster at the Indiana University (IU) Concert Orchestra and the Terre Haute Symphony Orchestra .

Education
Ling began studying violin at the age of six under the tutelage of the late Professor Lin Yaoji of the Central Conservatory of Music, Beijing. He completed his undergraduate and graduate studies at the Indiana University, and has studied at Rice University in Houston. He has studied with Henry Kowalski, Ik-Hwan Bae, Alan de Veritch and Cho-Liang Lin.

Career
As a child, Ling toured around the world as a violin soloist. He has also collaborated with the HK Phil, the Hong Kong Chinese Orchestra and the China Film Philharmonic Orchestra, and has given recitals in Hong Kong, the North America and Europe.

He is an active chamber musician, having performed with Cho-Liang Lin, Jaime Laredo, Trey Lee, the Shanghai String Quartet and has been invited as a guest artist at the Chamber Residency of Banff Centre in Canada and the Hong Kong International Chamber Music Festival.

A dedicated music educator, Ling has directed The Robert H. N. Ho Family Foundation Orchestral Fellowship Scheme as well as being invited to teach at the NTSO Youth Music Camp in Taiwan. He is currently an adjunct faculty member of the Hong Kong Baptist University and The Hong Kong Academy for Performing Arts.

Selected performances

Personal life

Andrew Ling dedicated his solo recital performance of "The Flying Frenchman" with the Hong Kong Philharmonic Orchestra to his son who celebrates his 100th day birthday that day.

External links 
Andrew Ling at Hong Kong Philharmonic
Andrew Ling  interview on South China Morning Post
Andrew Ling  A Duo Recital presented by Leisure and Cultural Services Department
Andrew Ling's Music Jukebox

Andrew ling playing the US$45million Stradivaria viola

Living people
Hong Kong classical musicians
Contemporary classical music performers
Child classical musicians
Indiana University alumni
Year of birth missing (living people)
Violists